Albert Shepherd (29 August 1936 – 10 July 2019) was an English actor, known for playing Don Rogers in Crossroads from 1970 until 1974.

Life and career
Albert was born and raised in York and attended the St George's Roman Catholic Secondary School. Before becoming an actor he worked as a railway engineer for nine years, then decided to try acting so went off to Webber Douglas Academy of Dramatic Art in London for two years.

He starred in a TV series called Rosie, which was filmed in Scarborough, from 1979 to 1981, and also appeared in the 1968 film Secret Ceremony alongside Elizabeth Taylor. He was also the first person to speak on the 1969 movie Battle of Britain, and appeared in a number of other films and TV series.

Albert retired from acting in the mid-1980s following the death of his wife Rosaleen to look after his three children—Anthony, Jonathan and Gerard.

He lived in Crayke north of York for the last 45 years of his life.

Albert died at York Hospital from lung cancer in July 2019, aged 82, just three weeks after he was diagnosed.

Filmography

Film

Television

References

External links
 

1936 births
2019 deaths
English male film actors
English male soap opera actors
Male actors from York
20th-century English male actors